Cyrus of Alexandria ( al-Muqawqis) was a Melchite patriarch of the see of Alexandria in the 7th century, one of the originators of monothelitism and the last Byzantine prefect of Egypt. He died in Alexandria on March 21, 642.

Bishop of Phasis
In 620 he was appointed Bishop of Phasis in Colchis. In 626 the Byzantine Emperor Heraclius, in the course of his Persian campaign, consulted him about a plan for bringing the Miaphysites of Egypt back to the Church, and to the support, of the empire. The monoenergist plan, suggested by Sergius, Patriarch of Constantinople, consisted of agreeing on the Chalcedonian principle that there were two natures of Christ, while practically nullifying it by saying he had only one energy,  (ἓν θέλημα καὶ μία ἐνέργεια). Cyrus supported this formula after being reassured by Sergius that it was endorsed by Pope Honorius I in Rome and that it was opposed to neither the Fathers nor to Chalcedon and was destined to achieve great result. In return he was raised by Heraclius to the See of Alexandria in 630 in opposition to its Miaphysite Patriarch.

Patriach of Alexandria
Once a patriarch, Cyrus continued trying to unite Miaphysites and Chalcedonians around monoenergism, now evolving into monotheletism, the idea of one will. In a synod held at Alexandria in June 633, he proposed what is known as the Pact of Union, plerophoría (πληροφορία) or "Satisfactio", an agreement in nine articles, the seventh of which is a bold assertion of monothelitism. The Miaphysites (who were also called Theodosians or Severians) welcomed the agreement but remarked that Chalcedon was coming to them, not they to Chalcedon. Thousands of clergy, soldiers and ordinary people converted with Cyrus away from the miaphysite position at this time, but the change did not last.

It was hoped that Pope Honorius I would be won over to the monothelete position. Cyrus attended another synod at Cyprus under Arkadios II in 636 along with 45 other senior clergy, at which he served as moderator and permitted Monothelite opponents to submit their case to the Emperor. When Cyrus received the Emperor's Monothelite response, the Ecthesis, Cyrus signed it in 637.

For 10 years, Cyrus severely persecuted the Egyptians, attempting to bring them, by force if necessary, to his faith. The majority of the Egyptian people did not recognise him as patriarch, instead recognising Pope Benjamin I, who had gone into hiding and was relentlessly hunted by Cyrus, though without success. On one occasion, Cyrus's troops seized Benjamin’s brother Mennas and burned him with torches until, according to Severus ibn al-Muqaffa, ‘the fat dropped down from both his sides to the ground’. Still unshaken, his teeth were pulled out, and he was stuffed into a sack filled with sand and taken by a boat seven bowshots away from the shore. Three times he was offered his life if he accepted the Council of Chalcedon, and three times he refused, before he was thrown into the sea and drowned. 'Yet it was not they who were victorious over Menas, that champion of the faith, but Menas who by Christian patience overcame them,' says the biographer of Benjamin.

On another occasion, Cyrus sent for an Egyptian Archbishop, Samuel the Confessor, and had him brought in chains like a thief. Samuel went rejoicing in the Lord and saying, 'Please God, it will be given me this day to shed my blood for the name of Christ.' When Cyrus saw him, he ordered the soldiers to beat him until his blood ran like water. Then he said to him, 'Samuel, you wicked ascetic, who is he that made you abbot of the monastery, and bade you teach the monks to curse me and my faith?' Holy Abba Samuel answered, 'It is good to obey God and His holy Archbishop Benjamin rather than obey you and your devilish doctrine, O son of Satan, Antichrist, Beguiler.' Cyrus bade the soldiers to smite him on the mouth, saying, 'Your spirit is kindled, Samuel, because the monks glorify you as an ascetic: but I will teach you what it is to speak evil of dignities, since you render me not the honour which is my due as Archbishop and my due as Controller of the Revenues of the land of Egypt.' Samuel replied, 'Satan also was controller, having angels under him: but his pride and unbelief estranged him from the glory of God. So with you also, O Chalcedonian Deceiver, your faith is defiled and you are more accursed than the devil and his angels.' On hearing this, the Cyrus was filled with fury against the saint, and signed to the soldiers to strike him dead, but the ruler of Faiyum delivered him from their hands. When Cyrus saw that Samuel had escaped, he ordered him driven away from the Nitrian Desert.

Cyrus appointed Chalcedonian bishops over every Egyptian city up to Ansena, putting Coptic priests to death whenever they were found. The Coptic people, though left without priests, had secret gatherings. One priest, Agathon, would risk his life every night visiting Alexandria to administer communion there. He later succeeded Benjamin as pope. Some Copts attempted to assassinate Cyrus, but the plot was discovered by Eudocianus, brother of Domentianus who was a general in the Muslim conquest of Egypt. The conspirators were killed with no trial.

Military prefect
When Umar's general, 'Amr ibn al-'As known to the Romans as Amru, threatened the Prefecture of Egypt, Cyrus was made prefect and entrusted with the conduct of the war. Certain humiliating stipulations, to which he subscribed for the sake of peace, angered his imperial master so much that he was recalled and harshly accused of connivance with the Rashidun Caliphate; however, he was soon restored to his former authority, owing to the impending siege of Alexandria, but could not avert the fall of the great city in 640. He signed a peace treaty that surrendered Alexandria and Egypt on 8 November 641 before dying in 642.

Writings
From Cyrus there are three letters to Sergius and the "Satisfactio", all preserved in the acts of the Roman Synod of the Lateran and of the Sixth Œcumenical Council (Mansi, X, 1004; XI, 560, 562, 964).

The first letter is an acceptation of the Ecthesis; in the second Cyrus describes his perplexity between Pope Leo and Sergius; the conversion of the Theodosians is narrated in the third.

The seventh article of the "Satisfactio" — the others are irrelevant — reads thus: "The one and same Christ, the Son, performs the works proper to God and to man by one theandric operation according to St. Dionysius".

They showed, moreover, the inanity of his claim to the support of the Fathers, and explained how the Divine and human natures of Christ, sometimes styled one, because they belong to the same person and work in perfect harmony, can no more by physically identified than the natures from which they proceed. Historians are not agreed as to how Cyrus came by this. Some think that he was, from the outset, a Monophysite at heart. Others, with more reason, hold that he was led to this belief by Sergius and Heraclius.

Cyrus was posthumously condemned as a heretic in the Lateran Council of 649 (Denzinger, Enchiridion, 217, 219) and in 680 at the Third Ecumenical Council of Constantinople (Denzinger, 238; Mansi, XI, 554).

See also
Al-Muqawqis

References

Sources

7th-century Patriarchs of Alexandria
7th-century Roman governors of Egypt
Year of birth missing
642 deaths
Lazica
People declared heretics by the first seven ecumenical councils
Heraclius
Muslim conquest of Egypt